Princess Joséphine Caroline of Belgium (18 October 1872 – 6 January 1958) was the youngest daughter of Prince Philippe, Count of Flanders and Princess Marie of Hohenzollern-Sigmaringen. She was an older sister of Albert I of Belgium.

Biography

Joséphine Caroline married her maternal first cousin Prince Karl Anton of Hohenzollern-Sigmaringen on 28 May 1894 in Brussels. He was the youngest son of her mother's oldest brother. Their relationship was described as a happy one. They lived in Namedy Castle on the Rhine which they had purchased in 1909. During World War I, she made her home a military hospital for wounded soldiers while her husband served as a Prussian lieutenant general. Exhausted from years of warfare, he died shortly after his return to Namedy in 1919, at age 51. In 1935, Joséphine Caroline entered a Benedictine convent in Namur, taking the name of Sister Marie-Josephine, and remained a nun for the rest of her life.  She is buried in the Couvent des Soeurs de Notre-Dame (Convent of the Sisters of Our Lady) in Namur.

Marriage and issue
On 28 May 1894 in Brussels, she married her maternal first cousin Prince Karl Anton of Hohenzollern-Sigmaringen, later simply of Hohenzollern (Sigmaringen, 1 September 1868 – Namedy, 21 February 1919), third son of Leopold, Prince of Hohenzollern-Sigmaringen, later simply of Hohenzollern and Infanta Antónia of Portugal. They had the following children;

Princess Stephanie Josephine Karola Philippine Leopoldine Marie of Hohenzollern (Potsdam, 8 April 1895 –  Dießen am Ammersee, 7 August 1975) she married Joseph-Ernst Fugger, Prince of Glött on 18 May 1920 and they were divorced on 25 May 1943.
Princess Marie Antoinette Wilhelmine Auguste Viktoria of Hohenzollern (Potsdam, 23 October 1896 – Bolzano, 4 July 1965) she married Baron Egon Eyrl von und zu Waldgries und Liebenaich on 27 November 1924. They had four children:
Baroness Veronika Eyrl von und zu Waldgries und Liebenaich (15 August 1926 – 13 August 1942) she died at the age of fifteen.
Baroness Stephanie Eyrl von und zu Waldgries und Liebenaich (17 December 1930 – 19 January 1998) she married Josef von Zallinger-Stillendorf on 27 November 1950. They have four children.
Baroness Elisabeth Eyrl von und zu Waldgries und Liebenaich (15 May 1932 – 8 July 2011) she married Bernhard Baron von Hohenbuhel gennant Heufler of Rasen on 9 August 1954. They have six children.
Baron Carl Josef Eyrl von und zu Waldgries und Liebenaich (19 January 1935) he married Countess Isabelle Ceschi a Santa Croce on 12 April 1975. They have four children.
Prince Albrecht Ludwig Leopold Tassilo of Hohenzollern (Potsdam, 28 September 1898 – Bühl, 30 July 1977) he married Ilse Margot von Friedeburg on 19 May 1921. They had five children:
Princess Josephine Wilhelma of Hohenzollern-Sigmaringen (Namedy, 15 February 1922 – Andernach, 11 July 2006)
Princess Luise-Dorothea of Hohenzollern-Sigmaringen (Namedy, 9 February 1924 – Bad Kreuznach, 11 November 1988) she married Egbert Count of Plettenberg on 11 June 1947. They have seven children.
Princess Rose-Margarethe of Hohenzollern-Sigmaringen (Namedy, 19 February 1930 – Neuss, 16 February 2005) she married Edgar Pfersdorf on 15 September 1955. They have four children.
Princess Maria of Hohenzollern-Sigmaringen (Namedy, 1 April 1935 – Namedy, 1 April 1935) she died at one day old.
Prince Godehard-Friedrich of Hohenzollern-Sigmaringen (Koblenz, 17 April 1939 – Namedy, 21 May 2001) he married Heide Hansen on 29 August 1971. They have two children.
Princess Henriette Leopoldine Wilhelmine of Hohenzollern-Sigmaringen (29 September 1907 – 3 October 1907) she died at four days old.

Honours
  Dame Grand Cross of the Order of Saint Isabel, 19 June 1894 (Kingdom of Portugal)
  Dame of the Order of Saint Elizabeth, 1900 – wedding Gift in honour of her brother (Kingdom of Bavaria)
  Dame of the Order of Louise (German Empire)

Ancestry

References

Belgian princesses
Princesses of Hohenzollern-Sigmaringen
1872 births
1958 deaths
House of Saxe-Coburg and Gotha (Belgium)
Nobility from Brussels
Princesses of Saxe-Coburg and Gotha
Dames of the Order of Saint Isabel
20th-century Belgian Roman Catholic nuns